Lars Johansson (born 1 March 1953) is a Swedish sailor. He competed in the 470 event at the 1976 Summer Olympics.

References

External links
 

1953 births
Living people
Swedish male sailors (sport)
Olympic sailors of Sweden
Sailors at the 1976 Summer Olympics – 470
People from Kristinehamn
Sportspeople from Värmland County